Prince Edward Island is the least populous province in Canada with 154,331 residents as of the 2021 census and is the smallest in land area at . These municipalities provide local government services to their residents in the form of fire protection, municipal planning services, and emergency measures planning. The remaining unincorporated areas have no local government.

Municipal statuses in Prince Edward Island are cities, towns, rural municipalities, and resort municipalities. Under Prince Edward Island's Municipal Government Act (MGA), which came into force on December 23, 2017, the formation of a municipality can be proposed by the Minister of Fisheries and Communities, the council of an existing municipality, or a petition signed by 30% of the residents that would be the electors of the new municipality. To be eligible for city or town status, certain minimum estimated population and total property assessment value criteria must be met. If those criteria are not met, rural municipality status can be granted if it is the opinion of the Minister of Fisheries and Communities that it would be in the public interest. The province's lone resort municipality – the Resort Municipality of Stanley Bridge, Hope River, Bayview, Cavendish and North Rustico – was established by order in council in 1990. The 2017  prevents creation of any new resort municipalities.

Prince Edward Island has two cities, ten towns, fifty rural municipalities and one resort municipality, which are distributed across three counties – Kings, Prince and Queens. Charlottetown is Prince Edward Island's capital and largest municipality by population while Belfast is the largest municipality by land area. The smallest municipalities by population and land area are Tignish Shore and St. Louis respectively.

Cities 

Under the province's , a municipality may incorporate as a city if it has an estimated population of 15,000 or more and a total property assessment value of $750 million or more. Should a city no longer meet these requirements, the Minister of Fisheries and Communities may recommend to the Lieutenant Governor in Council to change the status of the municipality to a more appropriate status.

Prince Edward Island has two cities. The province's second city is Summerside, which is located on the west side of the island. Starting with the municipal elections in 2018, the  enables cities to elect a mayor and a minimum of eight councillors. With general municipal elections occurring every four years, the next municipal election is scheduled for November 2022.

Towns 
Under the province's , a municipality may incorporate as a town if has an estimated population of 4,000 or more but is less than 15,000, and a total property assessment value of $200 million or more, but is less than $750 million. Should a town no longer meet these requirements, the Minister of Fisheries and Communities may recommend to the Lieutenant Governor in Council to change the status of the municipality to a more appropriate status.

Prince Edward Island has ten towns that are incorporated municipalities, which had a cumulative population of 32,632 in the 2021 census. The province's largest and smallest towns are Stratford and North Rustico with populations of 10,927 and 648 respectively. Three Rivers is also the province's newest town, which incorporated as a town on September 28, 2018 through the amalgamation of the towns of Georgetown and Montague, five rural municipalities (Brudenell, Cardigan, Lorne Valley, Lower Montague, and Valleyfield), and portions of three adjacent unincorporated areas. Starting with the municipal elections in 2018, the  enables towns to elect a mayor and a minimum of six councillors. With general municipal elections occurring every four years, the next municipal election is scheduled for November 2022.

Rural municipalities 
Under the province's , municipalities that previously held community status under the previous Municipalities Act, which originally came into force in 1983, were carried forward as rural municipalities. With the amalgamation of Brackley and Winsloe South on December 15, 2017, and then the  coming into force eight days later on December 23, 2017, Prince Edward Island had 58 communities that became rural municipalities. On September 28, 2018, three amalgamations reduced the total amount of rural municipalities to 50. As of the 2021 census, the province's largest and smallest rural municipalities are West River and Tignish Shore with populations of 3,473 and 64 respectively. Starting with the municipal elections in 2018, the  enables rural municipalities to elect a mayor and a minimum of six councillors. With general municipal elections occurring every four years, the next municipal election is scheduled for November 2022.

Resort municipalities 
Prince Edward Island has one municipality holding resort municipality status. The Resort Municipality of Stanley Bridge, Hope River, Bayview, Cavendish and North Rustico was established as a resort municipality in 1990. The province's  allows this resort municipality to continue yet prevents the establishment of additional resort municipalities in the future. Starting with the municipal elections in 2018, the  enables  the province's lone resort municipality to elect a mayor and a minimum of six councillors. With general municipal elections occurring every four years, the next municipal election is scheduled for November 2022.

List of municipalities

See also 

History of Prince Edward Island
List of census agglomerations in Atlantic Canada
List of population centres in Prince Edward Island

Notes

References

External links 
Federation of Prince Edward Island Municipalities
Municipalities – Government of Prince Edward Island: Department of Fisheries and Communities

Municipalities